Joel Sequeira (born 15 March 1988) in Goa is an Indian footballer who last played as a midfielder for ONGC in the I-League.

Career statistics

Club
Statistics accurate as of 11 May 2013

References

External links
Profile at i-league.org.

Indian footballers
1988 births
Living people
I-League players
ONGC FC players
Association football midfielders

Footballers from Goa